The  Rajasthan Legislative Assembly or the Rajasthan Vidhan Sabha is the unicameral legislature of the Indian state of Rajasthan.

The assembly meets at Vidhana Bhavan situated in Jaipur, the capital of Rajasthan. Members of the Legislative assembly are directly elected by the people for a term of 5 years. Presently, the legislative assembly consists of 200 members.

Origin 
The formation of the House of People's Representatives in Rajasthan is significant in Indian Constitutional history since it was the result of the merging of 22 princely states of the former Rajputana with the Union of India.

As per the provision of Article 168 of India's newly framed constitution, each state was required to form a legislature consisting of one or two Houses. Rajasthan chose unicameralism for its legislature, which is known as the Rajasthan Legislative Assembly.

History
The First Rajasthan Legislative Assembly (1952–57) was inaugurated on 31 March 1952. It had a strength of 160 members. The strength was increased to 190 after the merger of the erstwhile Ajmer State with Rajasthan in 1956. The Second (1957–62) and Third (1962–67) Legislative Assemblies had a strength of 176. The Fourth (1967–72) and Fifth (1972–77) Legislative Assembly comprised 184 members each. The strength became 200 from the Sixth (1977–80) Legislative Assembly onwards.

Privileges 
Article 194 of the Indian Constitution specifies the powers, privileges, and immunities of the House of Legislature, as well as its members and committees.

Some of the important privileges are: 
 Freedom of speech in the legislature 
 Immunity for members from any proceedings in any court relating to anything said or any vote given by them in the legislature or any committee thereof 
 Prohibition on courts inquiring into legislative processes 
 Freedom from arrest in civil proceedings for the members during the continuance of the session of the House

15th Rajasthan Assembly

See also
 List of constituencies of Rajasthan Legislative Assembly
 Third Ashok Gehlot ministry

References

External links
 Rajasthan Lok Sabha Election 2019 Results Website
 Rajasthan Assembly Election 2013 News, Candidates List

 
State legislatures of India
Unicameral legislatures